The Silhouette is the second studio album by gothic/doom metal band, Ava Inferi. It was released on Season of Mist, on 15 October 2007.

Track listing
All Songs Written By Eriksen/Simoes, except where noted.
 "A Dança das Ondas" – 5:22
 "Viola" – 8:02
 "The Abandoned" – 5:33
 "Oathbound" – 1:55 (Simoes)
 "The Dual Keys" – 7:13
 "Wonders of Dusk" – 4:59
 "La Stanza Nera" – 5:41
 "Grin of Winter" – 4:58
 "Pulse of the Earth" – 6:35

Personnel
 Carmen Susana Simões - vocals
 Rune Eriksen - electric and clean guitars, effects
 Jaime S. Ferreira - bass
 João Samora (Bandido) - drums, percussion

References

External links
 Interview with Rune Eriksen in Lords of Metal E-zine

Ava Inferi albums
2007 albums
Season of Mist albums